Jogiara is a village in Darbhanga district in the Indian state of Bihar. The village is also served by India Post. Its Postal Code is 847303.

History 
Jogiara is a place of historical importance. The village was never entitled to pay the land revenue due to continuous struggle and fight against the Mughal emperor. The villagers struggled and showed great bravery against the Mughal dynasty. Mithila Maharaja Sir Kameshwar Singh, also known as Darbhanga Maharaja, never levied any land tax on this village. Jogiara village also participated hugely against the British rule.

Jogiara is a base of royal families and culture. The oldest Zamindari status holding house is Haweli Deudhi of Jogiara. This Palace called as Deudhi was made by Babu Gopal Singh, a Zamindar. The next haweli called the Darbaar of Babu Narayan Prasad Singh.

Demographics
As of 2011 Indian Census, Jogiara had a total population of 6,717, of which 3,456 were males and 3,261 were females.

Transport

Railways
Jogiara village has a railway station named Jogiara and is a part of East Central Railway, Samastipur railway division. It is connected from two major stations Darbhanga and Sitamarhi. The adjacent stations are Dewra – Bandhauli (towards Darbhanga) and chanduana halt (towards Sitamarhi). A much-awaited stretch of 68 km of broad gauge from Darbhanga- Sitamarhi was completed in year 2008. Earlier there was meter gauge line in this route. Currently 12 trains halts at Jogiara railway station.  Jogiara is directly connected to Kolkata by Mithlanchal express and is connected with several major cities of India via Darbhanga.

Roads
Jogiara is also well connected by road. It can be reached by following, Jale-Atarwel Road, Pupri-Madhubani State Highway (SH52) and is also connected to Darbhanga via Garri, Kamtaul-Darbhanga Highway (SH57). It is 38km from Darbhanga and  takes around 1 hour to reach via Kamtaul Highway.

Air
Jogiara village does not have an air transport service. The current nearest air transport facility is available at Patna Airport which is around 158 km by road from jogiara. A new airport is going to be operational in Darbhanga which is around 41km from village.

References

Villages in Darbhanga district